Lawrence "Larry" W. Reed (born September 29, 1953), also known as Larry Reed, is president emeritus of the Foundation for Economic Education (FEE), where he has served as the Humphreys Family Senior Fellow since May 2019. Before joining FEE, Reed served as president of the Mackinac Center for Public Policy, a Midland, Michigan-based free-market think tank. To date, he remains Mackinac's president emeritus.

Personal life
Reed was born and raised in Pennsylvania, United States.

He has cited the 1968 event between the Czechs and the Soviets known as the "Prague Spring", as the genesis for his interest in liberty, and has referred to the Czech cause as a "flowering of liberty". As a result of interactions with FEE in his teen years, Reed became exposed to the ideas of Friedrich Hayek, Ludwig von Mises, and others from the Austrian school of economics.

In 1982, he was the Republican candidate for U. S. Congress in Michigan's 10th district.

Education and appointments
Reed holds a Bachelor of Arts degree in economics from Grove City College (1975) and a Master of Arts degree in history from Slippery Rock University of Pennsylvania (1978).

From 1977 to 1984 he taught economics at Midland, Michigan's Northwood University, serving as chairman of the Department of Economics from 1982 to 1984. While at Northwood, Reed designed the university's dual major in economics and business management and founded its annual "Freedom Seminar".

In addition to his undergraduate and graduate education, Reed was awarded an honorary Doctorate of Public Administration from Central Michigan University in 1994 and an honorary Doctorate of Laws from Northwood University in 2008. Reed is also the recipient of the Grove City College Distinguished Alumni Award.

Long active in Michigan policy, Reed was appointed in 1993 by the state's then-Governor John Engler (R) to the Headlee Amendment Blue Ribbon Commission. The commission had been established as part of the state's 1978 "Headlee amendment" for the purpose of limiting local and state government spending. It was officially abolished in 2004 by former Michigan Governor Jennifer Granholm.

In 1994, Reed was named to the Secchia Commission on Total Quality Government, a task force charged by Governor Engler to streamline Michigan state government. Engler and many of his administration's officials frequently cited the work of the Mackinac Center as influential in shaping administration policies.

In December 2007, the Washington, D.C., based Heritage Foundation named Reed as a Visiting Senior Fellow.

Career
Reed's interests in political and economic affairs have taken him as a freelance journalist to 78 countries on six continents since 1985.

Over the past twenty-five years, he has reported on hyperinflation in South America, black markets from behind the Iron Curtain, reforms and repression in China and Cambodia, and civil war inside Nicaragua and Mozambique. Additionally, he spent time with the Contra rebels during the Nicaraguan civil war; and lived for two weeks with Mozambique rebel forces at their bush headquarters in 1991, while the country was engaged at the height of their guerrilla conflict. Among many foreign experiences, Reed visited Cambodia in 1989 with his late friend, Academy Award winner Haing S. Ngor.

In 1986, while traveling with the Polish anti-communist underground, Reed was arrested and detained by border police.
Reed's articles have appeared in The Wall Street Journal, Christian Science Monitor, Baltimore Sun, Detroit News, Detroit Free Press and USA Today, and others.

During a 2003 address on the floor of the House of Representatives, Congressman Ron Paul paid tribute to Reed, acknowledging him as "one of America's leading advocates for liberty", and remarked that Reed's writings "reflect his unswerving commitment to limited government and the free market as the best way to promote human happiness."

Foundation for Economic Education
On September 1, 2008, Reed became president of the Foundation for Economic Education (FEE). FEE, founded in 1946 by Leonard Read, has been recognized as the first not-for-profit organization of its kind, familiarizing people with free-market economics. It is FEE's mission to provide people with the "economic and moral" foundations of a free and civil society. As president, Reed hopes to reassert FEE's position as a "mothership" for the freedom movement at large.

According to Reed, "FEE believes a free society is not only possible, it is imperative because there is no acceptable alternative for a civilized people. Our vision for the future is that through education, men and women will understand the moral, philosophic and economic principles that undergird a free society. They will appreciate the direct connection between those principles and their material and spiritual welfare. They will strive to pass those principles on from one generation to the next."

Economic philosophy
Reed identifies strongly with the Austrian School of economics, and has referred to competition as one of the highest and most beneficial forms of human cooperation.

Writing
Reed's 2012 book is A Republic – If We Can Keep It, is a collection of essays by Reed and historian Burton W. Folsom, Jr. that surveys the economic history of the United States and the modern world.

Another of Reed's books is Striking the Root: Essays on Liberty, a bundling of works on the topic of government use of force, previously published in FEE's magazine, The Freeman.

Reed's other books include Lessons from the Past: The Silver Panic of 1893, and Private Cures for Public Ills: The Promise of Privatization, both published by the Foundation for Economic Education, and When We Are Free, with Dale M. Haywood.

Academic books (authored or coauthored)
 Republic – If We Can Keep It (with Burton W. Folsom, Jr., CreateSpace, 2012) 
 Striking the Root: Essays on Liberty 
 Lessons from the Past: The Silver Panic of 1893 
 Private Cures for Public Ills: The Promise of Privatization 
 When We Are Free, with Dale M. Haywood

References

1953 births
Living people
20th-century American economists
21st-century American economists
American libertarians
Austrian School economists
Economists from Michigan
Foundation for Economic Education
Grove City College alumni
Libertarian economists
Mackinac Center for Public Policy
People from Midland, Michigan
Slippery Rock University of Pennsylvania alumni